Oberea nigrocincta is a species of beetle in the family Cerambycidae. It was described by Per Olof Christopher Aurivillius in 1907.

Subspecies
 Oberea nigrocincta nigrocincta Aurivillius, 1907
 Oberea nigrocincta atroantennata Breuning, 1976

References

Beetles described in 1907
nigrocincta